Saint Romanus of Subiaco (died ca. 550 AD) was a hermit in the area around Subiaco, Italy.

He is remembered as having assisted and influenced Saint Benedict of Nursia, when the latter had just begun his life as a hermit.  Romanus provided Benedict with clothing (a religious habit), food, and housing (in the form of a cave above the river Anio, which Benedict lived in for 3 years.   
  
Romanus is said to have gone to Gaul, where he founded a small monastery at Dryes-Fontrouge (Druyes-les-Belles-Fontaines) near Auxerre. He died there about 550 and was venerated as a saint. He is sometimes identified with the Romanus of Auxerre who was venerated as Bishop of Auxerre on 8 or 6 October.

References

External links
 Romanus of Subiaco

5th-century births
550 deaths
People from Subiaco, Lazio
6th-century Christian saints
Italian hermits
Italian saints
Year of birth unknown